Thizz City is a compilation album by American rapper Messy Marv, released on August 10, 2010, via SMC Recordings. The album includes performances by San Quinn, Berner and Cellski, among others, and guest appearances from Keak da Sneak, Glasses Malone, Skaz One and more. Thizz City charted on the Top R&B/Hip-Hop Albums chart.

Track listing

References

2010 albums
Messy Marv albums
SMC Recordings albums